The Christopher Ewart-Biggs Memorial Prize was created in 1977, in memory of Christopher Ewart-Biggs, British Ambassador to Ireland, who was assassinated by the Provisional Irish Republican Army in 1976.

Founded by his Widow Jane Ewart-Biggs (following her death, the literary prize is currently administered jointly by their 3 children) following the death of her husband, its stated goal is to promote peace and reconciliation in Ireland, a greater understanding between the peoples of the United Kingdom and Ireland, or closer co-operation between partners of the European Community now known as the EU.

It is awarded to a book, a play or a piece of journalism that best fulfills this aim, published during a two-year period up to December 31 of the year preceding the year in which the prize is awarded. The value of the biennially awarded literary prize is currently set at £7500, an increase on the original £5000 award of 1977.

Past winners
The years of publication/broadcast for which the prize was awarded is given. In earlier years the Prize was identified by the year of award, but the official website now gives year of publication/broadcast.

 1978: A. T. Q. Stewart, The Narrow Ground: Aspects of Ulster 1609-1969
 1978: Mícheál Mac Gréil, Prejudice and Tolerance in Ireland
 1979: Stewart Parker, I'm A Dreamer, Montreal
 1979: Dervla Murphy, A Place Apart
 1980: Robert Kee, Ireland: A Television History
 1981: F. S. L. Lyons, Culture and Anarchy in Ireland, 1890-1939
 1982: Fortnight magazine
 1983: John Bowman, De Valera and the Ulster Question, 1917-1973
 1984: Oliver MacDonagh, States of Mind: A Study of Anglo-Irish Conflict, 1780-1980
 1984: Padraig O'Malley, The Uncivil Wars: Ireland Today
 1985: Brian Friel, Translations
 1986: Frank McGuinness, Observe the Sons of Ulster Marching Towards the Somme
 1986 Special Award: Hubert Butler
 1987–88: David McKittrick and Mary Holland, newspaper columns
 1989–90: John H. Whyte, Interpreting Northern Ireland
 1989–90 special citation: Blackstaff Press
 1991–92: Brian Keenan, An Evil Cradling
 1993–94: Fionnuala O'Connor, In Search of a State: Catholics in Northern Ireland
 1995–96: Norman Porter, Rethinking Unionism: An Alternative Vision for Northern Ireland
 1995–96: Sebastian Barry, The Steward of Christendom
 1997–98: Peter Hart, The IRA and its Enemies; Violence and Community in Cork, 1916-1923
 1999–2000: David McKittrick, Seamus Kelters, Brian Feeney and Chris Thornton, Lost Lives: The Stories of the Men, Women and Children who Died as a Result of the Northern Ireland Troubles
 2001–02: Linen Hall Library, Troubled Images Project 
 2003–04: Tom Dunne, Rebellions: Memoir, Memory and 1798 
 2003–04 Special Award: Garret FitzGerald
 2005–06: Richard English, Irish Freedom: The History of Nationalism in Ireland 
 2005–06 Special Award: Michael Longley
 2007–08: David Park, The Truth Commissioner
 2007–08 Special Award: Fergus D'Arcy, Remembering the War Dead
 2009–10: Timothy Knatchbull, From a Clear Blue Sky: Surviving the Mountbatten Bomb
 2009–10: Guy Hibbert and Oliver Hirschbiegel, Five Minutes of Heaven
 2011–12: Julieann Campbell, Setting the Truth Free: The Inside Story of the Bloody Sunday Justice Campaign
 2011–12: Douglas Murray, Bloody Sunday: Truth, Lies and the Saville Inquiry
 2011–12: Special Award: Peter Taylor (for his work covering Northern Ireland over many years)
 2013–14: Charles Townshend, The Republic: The Fight for Irish Independence 1918-1923
 2013–14: Special Award, Colette Bryce, The Whole & Rain-domed Universe (in memory of Seamus Heaney)
 2015–17: Fergal Keane, Wounds: A Memoir of Love and War
 2015–17: Special Award, Marianne Elliott (for her achievement in advancing the understanding of Irish history in Britain)
 2018–19: Anna Burns, Milkman
 2018–19: Special Award, Katy Hayward, for her Twitter account
 2020-21: Gail McConnell, book of poetry, The Sun is Open, published by Penned in the Margins.

References

External links
 Official website

Awards established in 1977
1977 establishments in the United Kingdom
British literary awards
Political book awards